The Congreve rocket was a type of rocket artillery designed by British inventor Sir William Congreve in 1808.
The design was based upon the rockets deployed by the Kingdom of Mysore against the East India Company during the Second, Third, and Fourth Anglo-Mysore Wars. Lieutenant general Thomas Desaguliers, colonel commandant of the Royal Artillery at Woolwich, was impressed by reports of their effectiveness, and undertook several unsuccessful experiments to produce his own rocket weapons. Several captured Mysorean rockets were sent to England following the annexation of the Mysorean kingdom into British India following the death of Tipu Sultan in the siege of Seringapatam.

The project was continued chiefly with William Congreve, who set up a research and development programme at the Woolwich Arsenal's laboratory. After development work was complete the rockets were manufactured in quantity further north, near Waltham Abbey, Essex. He was told that "the British at Seringapatam had suffered more from the rockets than from the shells or any other weapon used by the enemy." "In at least one instance", an eyewitness told Congreve, "a single rocket had killed three men and badly wounded others." The rockets were used by the British, the Russians and Paraguay during the nineteenth century.

Indian rockets

The sultan of Mysore, Tipu Sultan and his father Hyder Ali developed the military tactic of using massed wave attacks supported by rocket artillery against enemy positions. In 1792, Tipu Sultan wrote a military manual called Fathul Mujahidin, in which two hundred artillerymen specialising in rocket artillery were prescribed to each Mysorean brigade (known as cushoons). Mysore had between sixteen and twenty-four cushoons of infantry. The areas of towns where rockets and fireworks were manufactured were known as "taramandal pet" ("galaxy market").

The rocket men were trained to launch their rockets at an angle calculated from the diameter of the cylinder and the distance of the target. In addition, wheeled rocket launchers were used in war that were capable of launching five to ten rockets almost simultaneously. 

The iron tube acted as a combustion chamber and contained well-packed black powder to act as the propellant. A rocket carrying about one pound of powder could travel almost . In contrast, rockets in Europe were not iron cased and could not take large chamber pressures. As a consequence European rockets were not capable of reaching distances anywhere near as great.

Hyder Ali introduced the first iron-cased rockets in warfare.

Hyder Ali's father was the naik or chief constable at Budikote, and he commanded 50 rocketmen for the Nawab of Arcot. There was a regular rocket corps in the Mysore Army, beginning with about 1,200 men in Hyder Ali's time.

Second Anglo-Mysore War

At the Battle of Pollilur (1780) during the Second Anglo-Mysore War, Colonel William Baillie's ammunition stores are thought to have been detonated by a hit from one of Tipu Sultan's Mysorean rockets, which contributed to the British defeat.

Third Anglo-Mysore War

In the Third Anglo-Mysore War in 1792, there is mention of two rocket units fielded by Tipu Sultan, 120 men and 131 men respectively. Lieutenant Colonel Knox was attacked by rockets near Srirangapatna on the night of 6 February 1792, while advancing towards the Kaveri River from the north. The rocket corps ultimately reached a strength of about 5,000 in Tipu Sultan's army. Mysore rockets were also used for ceremonial purposes. The Jacobin Club of Mysore sent a delegation to Tipu Sultan, and 500 rockets were launched as part of the gun salute.

Fourth Anglo-Mysore War

During the Fourth Anglo-Mysore War, rockets were again used on several occasions. One of these involved Colonel Arthur Wellesley, later famous as the First Duke of Wellington and the hero of the Battle of Waterloo. Quoting Forrest:"At this point (near the village of Sultanpet, Figure 5) there was a large tope, or grove, which gave shelter to Tipu's rocketmen and had obviously to be cleaned out before the siege could be pressed closer to Srirangapattanam Island. The commander chosen for this operation was Col. Wellesley, but advancing towards the tope after dark on 5 April 1799, he was set upon with rockets and musket-fires, lost his way and, as Beatson politely puts it, had to "postpone the attack" until a more favourable opportunity should offer. Wellesley's failure was glossed over by Beatson and other chroniclers, but the next morning he failed to report when a force was being paraded to renew the attack.
"On 22 April [1799], twelve days before the main battle, rocketeers worked their way around to the rear of the British encampment, then 'threw a great number of rockets at the same instant' to signal the beginning of an assault by 6,000 Indian infantry and a corps of Frenchmen, all directed by Mir Golam Hussain and Mohomed Hulleen Mir Mirans. The rockets had a range of about 1,000 yards. Some burst in the air like shells. Others, called ground rockets, on striking the ground, would rise again and bound along in a serpentine motion until their force was spent.According to one British observer, a young English officer named Bayly:"So pestered were we with the rocket boys that there was no moving without danger from the destructive missiles ...". He continued: "the rockets and musketry from 20,000 of the enemy were incessant. No hail could be thicker. Every illumination of blue lights was accompanied by a shower of rockets, some of which entered the head of the column, passing through to the rear, causing death, wounds, and dreadful lacerations from the long bamboos of twenty or thirty feet, which are invariably attached to them'."
During the decisive British victory at Srirangapattanam on 2 May 1799, a British shot struck a magazine of rockets within Tipu Sultan's fort, causing it to explode and send a towering cloud of black smoke up from the battlements, with cascades of exploding white light. Baird led the final attack on the fort on the afternoon of 4 May, and he was again met by "furious musket and rocket fire" - but it did not help much. The fort was taken in about an hour's time; in another hour or so, Tipu had been shot (the precise time of his death is not known) and the war was effectively over.

After the fall of Srirangapatna, 600 launchers, 700 serviceable rockets, and 9,000 empty rockets were found. Some of the rockets had pierced cylinders to allow them to act like incendiaries, while some had iron points or steel blades bound to the bamboo. These blades caused the rockets to become very unstable towards the end of their flight, causing the blades to spin around like flying scythes, cutting down all in their path.

William Congreve

Congreve began in 1804 by buying the best rockets on the London market, but found that their greatest range was only 600 yards. After spending ‘several hundred pounds’ of his own money on experiments, he was able to make a rocket that would travel 1,500 yards. He then ‘applied to Lord Chatham (the responsible minister in charge of the Ordnance Department)  for permission to have some large rockets made at Woolwich’. Permission was granted and ‘several six-pounder rockets’ made ‘on principles [he] had previously ascertained’ achieved a range of ‘full two thousand yards’. By the spring of 1806, he was producing 32-pounder rockets ranging 3,000 yards.
Congreve enjoyed the friendship of the Prince Regent, who supported his rocket projects and in whose household he served as an equerry from 1811. The Prince Regent was also the Elector of Hanover, and he was awarded the honorary rank of lieutenant colonel in the Hanoverian army's artillery in 1811. In 1813, Congreve declined the offer to command the Rocket Corps with rank in the Regiment of Artillery.
 
Congreve registered two patents and published three books on rocketry.

Design

The initial rocket cases were constructed of cardboard, but by 1806 they were made from sheet iron. The propulsion was of the same ingredients as gunpowder, the mixture of which varied with the different sizes of rocket. The warheads had side-mounted brackets which were used to attach wooden sticks of differing lengths, according to the sizes of rocket.

Rocket sizes were designated by the calibre of the tube, using the then-standard British method of using weight in pounds as a measure of cannon bore. Larger diameter rockets also had correspondingly longer tubes.

By 1813, the rockets were made available in three classes:
 Heavy – carcass/explosive rockets, 100- and 300-pounders; between five and six feet in length, with a stick length of 25–27 feet. Considered too cumbersome to use effectively in the field.
 Medium – 24- to 42-pounders; two to four feet in length, with a stick length of 15–20 feet
 Light – 6- to 18-pounders; 16-25 inches in length, with a stick length of 8–14 feet
The medium and light rockets could be case shot, shell, or explosive.

The 32-pounder was generally used for longer range bombardment, while a 12–pounder case shot was generally used for support of infantry and cavalry, with an extreme range of some 2,000 yards. The rockets could be fired from a wheeled bombarding frame, from a portable tripod, or even from a shallow trench or sloping bank. One in three horse artillerymen carried a launching trough for ground firing.

In December 1815, Congreve demonstrated a new design of rocket that had the rocket stick screwing centrally into the base of the case. This remained in service from 1817 until 1867, when it was replaced by the Hale rocket which required no stick and used clockwise rotation to impart stability in flight.

Contrary to popular belief, rockets could not out-range the equivalent smooth bore guns of the period. In real terms, the maximum effective range for the 12-pounder rockets and for the six-pounder gun was some 1,400 yards or about 1,280 meters. However, the rate of fire with rockets could be higher than the equivalent muzzle loading ordnance.  The absence of weighty ordnance meant that fewer horses were required. Captain Richard Bogue needed just 105 horses for his troop, compared with the 220 of Captain Cavalié Mercer's troop.

Rockets could be easily carried and readily deployed, particularly over difficult terrain or in small boats. This was amply demonstrated by the Royal Marine Artillery. The 12-pounder deployed at very close range was a fearsome weapon, as was seen at the battles of Göhrde and Leipzig in 1813, as well as the crossing of the Adour and the Battle of Toulouse in 1814.

The lack of specific accuracy with the larger rockets at long range was not a problem if the purpose was to set fire to a town or a number of moored ships; this was shown with the attack on the French Fleet in Aix and Basque roads and at the bombardment of Copenhagen. As Congreve himself had warned, however, they were of little use against fortified places, such as against Fort McHenry, because of the lack of combustible structures.

Accuracy at medium range remained a problem. This is illustrated by Mercer's description of G Troop Royal Horse Artillery during the retreat from Quatre Bras on 17 June 1815:

Use of Congreve rockets

Napoleonic Wars

The main user of Congreve rockets during the Napoleonic Wars was the Royal Navy, and men from the Royal Marine Artillery became experts in their use. The navy converted HMS Galgo and Erebus into rocket ships. The army became involved and was represented by various rocket detachments that changed into the two Rocket Troops, Royal Horse Artillery, on 1 January 1814.

In the autumn of 1805, the government decided upon an attack on Boulogne for the first test. William Sidney Smith was chosen to lead the expedition, accompanied by Congreve. Strong winds and rough seas hampered the operations on both the 20th and 21st, and the attack was not successful.

In April 1806, Rear Admiral Sidney Smith took rockets on a little-known mission to the Mediterranean to aid Sicily and the Kingdom of Naples in their struggle against the French. It was perhaps at Gaeta, near Naples, that Congreve's rockets had their first successful debut in battle. The second Boulogne rocket expedition, however, is more famous and is usually considered the first successful attempt.

On 8–9 October 1806, Commodore Edward Owen attacked the French flotilla at Boulogne. Captain William Jackson aboard HMS Musquito directed the boats firing 32 pound Congreve rockets. As night drew in on the channel, 24 cutters fitted with rocket frames formed a line and fired some 2,000 rockets at Boulogne. The barrage took only 30 minutes. Apparently the attack set a number of fires, but otherwise had limited effect. Still, it was enough to lead the British to employ rockets on a number of further occasions.

In 1807, Copenhagen was bombarded by more than 14,000 missiles in the form of metal balls, explosive and incendiary bombs from cannons and mortars, and about 300 Congreve rockets. The rockets contributed to the conflagration of the city.

The lighter, six-pounder battlefield rockets had been sent on the second Egyptian campaign in 1807, a further field trial which proved to be unsuccessful.

Congreve accompanied Lord Cochrane in the fire-ship, rocket, and shell attack on the French Fleet in Aix and Basque roads on 11 April 1809.

This rocket ship was deployed at the naval bombardment of Flushing, where they wrought such havoc that ‘General Monnet, the French commandant, made a formal protest to Lord Chatham’ against their use. Congreve was also present at this engagement and commanded five land frames.

In 1810, Wellington agreed to a field trial of Congreve's new 12-pounder rocket carrying case shot. It was not successful and was withdrawn.

In May 1813, a detachment which had been training with rockets at Woolwich under Second Captain Richard Bogue RHA was inspected by a committee of Royal Artillery officers who recommended that it be tried in combat. On 7 June 1813, Bogue's unit was designated the "Rocket Brigade". At the same time as being granted its new title, The Rocket Brigade was ordered to be augmented and to proceed on active service, with orders to join the Army of the North commanded by Bernadotte, the Crown Prince of Sweden. Using the modified 12-pounder at low trajectory from ground firing-troughs, the brigade saw action at the Battle of Gohrde and at the Battle of Leipzig on 18 October 1813, where it was successfully employed to attack the French stronghold of Paunsdorf, occupied by five French and Saxon battalions. Captain Bogue was however killed by a sharpshooter in the subsequent cavalry charge, and the village of Paunsdorf was eventually retaken by the French Imperial Guard. In the continuing campaign, the Rocket Brigade was also used in the sieges of Frederiksfort and Glückstadt, which surrendered on 13 December 1813 and 5 January 1814, respectively.  On 1 January 1814, the unit assumed the title of the "2nd Rocket Troop RHA" and on 18 January it received orders to join the force under the orders of Sir Thomas Graham in Holland.

In September 1813, Wellington agreed, with much reservation, that rockets could be sent out to join the army in Spain. On 3 October 1813, another Royal Artillery detachment embarked from Woolwich, trained in firing rockets. This group was called the "Rocket Company" and consisted of almost sixty men under Captain Lane. On 1 January 1814, together with another detachment under Captain Eliot, it assumed the title of the "1st Rocket Troop RHA". Captain Lane's rockets were very successfully deployed at the crossing of the Adour on 23 February 1814 and in the final battle in the Peninsular War at the Battle of Toulouse on 10 April 1814. Later that year, they were sent to be part of the disastrous expedition against the American Army at New Orleans, in Louisiana.  

By the time of the Waterloo campaign on 30 April 1815, the command of the 2nd Rocket Troop was formally taken over by Captain Whinyates. Wellington remained averse to rockets, so Whinyates took just 800 rockets into the field, as well as five 6-pounder guns; it would appear that the rockets replaced the usual howitzer in the structure of the troop.

War of 1812

The Royal Marine Artillery used Congreve rockets in several engagements during this conflict. Two battalions of Royal Marines were sent to North America in 1813. Attached to each battalion was a rocket detachment, each with an establishment of 25 men, commanded by lieutenants Balchild and John Harvey Stevens. Both rocket detachments were embarked aboard the transport vessel Mariner  Rockets were used in the engagements at Fort Oswego and Lundy's Lane.

The British used the Congreve rocket on U.S. soil for the first time in an attack on Lewes, DE, 6 & 7 April 1813.  The town was bombarded for 22 hours.

A third battalion of Royal Marines arrived in North America in 1814, with an attached rocket detachment commanded by Lieutenant John Lawrence, which subsequently participated in the Chesapeake campaign. During this campaign, the British used rockets at the Battle of Bladensburg to rout the American forces (which led to the capture and burning of Washington, D.C.), and at the Battle of North Point.

It was the use of ship-launched Congreve rockets by the British in the bombardment of Fort McHenry in the US in 1814 that inspired a phrase in the fifth line of the first verse of the United States' National Anthem, "The Star-Spangled Banner": "the rockets’ red glare".  fired the rockets from a 32-pound rocket battery installed below the main deck, which fired through portholes or scuttles pierced in the ship's side.

In Canada, rockets were used by the British at the Second Battle of Lacolle Mills, 30 March 1814. Rockets fired by a detachment of the Royal Marine Artillery, though inaccurate, unnerved the attacking American forces, and contributed to the defense of the blockhouse and mill.  Rockets were used again at the Battle of Cook's Mills, 19 October 1814.  An American force, sent to destroy General Gordon Drummond's source of flour, was challenged by a contingent of infantry which was supported by a light field cannon and a frame of Congreve rockets.  The rockets succeeded in discouraging the Americans from forming lines on the battlefield.

Captain Henry Lane's 1st Rocket Troop of the Royal Horse Artillery embarked at the end of 1814 in the transport vessel Mary with 40 artillerymen and 500 rockets and disembarked near New Orleans. Lieutenant Lawrence's rocket detachment took part in the final land engagement of the War of 1812 at Fort Bowyer in February 1815.

Bombardment of Algiers (1816)

Algiers had been the centre for pirates for some years, and her fleet had reached considerable proportions. Things reached a head after a particular atrocity; Britain decided to stamp out their activities, and the Netherlands agreed to assist. The combined fleet was composed of six British ships of the line and four frigates, plus five Dutch frigates; there were also 37 gun boats, 10 mortar boats, and eight rocket boats. Lieutenant JT Fuller and 19 other ranks from the Rocket Troop accompanied the expedition, together with 2,500 rockets, and were engaged alongside the Royal Marine Artillery.

In the bombardment of Algiers the rocket boats, gun boats, and mortar boats engaged the enemy's fleet moored inside the harbour. "It was by their fire that all the ships in the port, with the exception of the outer frigate, were in flames which extended rapidly over the whole arsenal, storehouses and gun boats, exhibiting a spectacle of awful grandeur".

The following day, the Dey capitulated and accepted all the surrender terms.

Whale hunting (1821)
On her voyage to the Greenland whale fishery in 1821  carried Congreve rockets. Sir William Congreve equipped her with rockets at his own expense to test their utility in whaling hunting. The Master General of Ordnance and the First Lord of the Admiralty had Lieutenant Colquhoun and two Marine artillerymen accompany the rockets. Captain Scoresby wrote a letter from the Greenland fishery in June reporting that the rockets had been a great success. Subsequent reports made clear that the rockets were fired from about 40 yards and were highly effective in killing whales that had already been conventionally harpooned.

A separate trial took place on another whaler. A letter from Captain Kay, of the ship Margaret, of London, dated 7 September, addressed to Lieut. Colquhoun, R.A., says

I have taken the liberty of inclosing you an account of a few trials I have made of Congreve's Rockets. Fearing the harpooners would not fire it correctly, I had determined to try its effect myself, and it was not until the 8th June that an opportunity presented. Early on that morning a whale, of the largest size, was discovered near the ship ; I immediately pursued it, and when sufficiently near, fired a rocket into its side; the effect it had on the fish was tremendous—every joint in its body shook, and, after lying for a few seconds in this agitated way, it turned on its back and died. It appeared on flinching, that the rocket had penetrated through the blubber and exploded in the crann (sic) near the ribs ; the stick and lower part of the rocket was taken out entire, the upper part was blown to pieces. My next attempt was on the 9th July, on a whale of the same size as the former, but owing to the rapid motion of the fish, and a heavy swell of the sea, which rendered the boat unsteady, the rocket entered below the middle part of the body, in consequence of which its effect was considerably lessened, its frame, however, was much shook by the explosion, and it immediately sunk, but rose again, blowing an immense quantity of blood: it was then struck with a harpoon, and killed with lances. On flinching, part of the stick of the rocket could only by found; it therefore appears probable that the rocket had burst in the inside of the fish.

In December Lieutenant Colquohon demonstrated the use of the rockets at Annapolis, Maryland. A newspaper story gave a detailed account of the experiments he performed.

First Anglo-Burmese War

A new shipment of Congreve rockets – which the Burmese had never seen – were used in the closing phase of the Battle of Yangon (May–December 1824) and in the subsequent battle of Danubyu (March–April 1825) where rocket fire stopped fighting elephants.

Congress Poland and November Uprising

Having witnessed the effects of incendiary rockets on grain warehouses of Danzig in 1813, artillery captain Józef Bem of the Kingdom of Poland started his own experiments with what was then called in Polish raca kongrewska. These culminated in his 1819 report Notes sur les fusées incendiaires (German edition: Erfahrungen über die Congrevischen Brand-Raketen bis zum Jahre 1819 in der Königlichen Polnischen Artillerie gesammelt, Weimar, 1820). The research took place in the Warsaw Arsenal, where captain Józef Kosiński also developed the multiple-rocket launchers adapted from horse artillery gun carriage.

The 1st Rocketeer Corps was formed in 1822 under the command of brigade general  and received its launchers in 1823. The unit received its baptism of fire during the Polish–Russian War 1830–31.
The rocket salvos fired by captain Karol Skalski's rocketeers during the twilight hours of the Battle of Olszynka Grochowska (25 February 1831) disrupted the Russian cavalry charges and forced them to retreat, which changed the tide of battle.
The rockets were also used several times (over a thousand stockpiled) by Polish freedom fighters during the final Battle of Warsaw (September 1831) in defense of the city.

Opium Wars

Congreve rockets were used from the bombardment of the Canton ports, by Nemesis (1839) in January 1841, to their use at the Battle of Palikao, in September 1860.

New Zealand Wars

During the period of the New Zealand Wars, the British Army used Congreve rockets against Māori fortifications—along with cannon fire—but found that simply digging trenches were sufficient to ensure the rockets became militarily ineffective so much that, like cannon, they became virtually unused and pointless.

American Civil War

The Confederate forces reportedly experimented with Congreve rockets.

Triple Alliance War

During the war between Brazil, Uruguay and Argentina against Paraguay (1865–1870), the Paraguayans deployed Congreve rockets in several battles including: the Battle of the Riachuelo (11 June 1865) when land-based rockets were used against Brazilian naval forces without success; the Battle of Paso de las Cuevas (12 August 1865) when the Paraguayans used artillery and rockets against a passing fleet of 12 Brazilian ships and one Argentinian ship; [[the [Battle of Pehuajó|combat of Corrales]] (31 January 1866) when Paraguayan rockets were used against Allied infantry and cavalry; the Battle of Tuyutí (24 May 1866) when Paraguayan forces used them to attack advancing allied cavalry; the Battle of Yataytí Corá (10 July 1866) where Paraguay used two launchers of 68-pound rockets; and again in Yataytí Corá (20 January 1867) when Paraguayan rockets caused a fire in the Argentinian camp. The Brazilian Navy employed them during the Battle of Curupayti (22 September 1866), trying to destroy the reinforced Paraguayan trench field, but the rockets fell short.

Crimean War and Indian Rebellion of 1857

During the Crimean War (1853 - 1856) and the Indian Rebellion of 1857, marines and sailors from the Royal Navy used Congreve Rockets. "Bluejackets" armed with rockets from HMS Shannon and HMS Pearl, under the command of Captain William Peel, were among the Naval Brigade participating in the force led by Sir Colin Campbell at the Second Relief of Lucknow. There is an eye-witness narrative of the taking of the heavily-fortified Shah Najaf mosque written by William Forbes Mitchell: at a late stage Captain Peel had ... brought his infernal machine, known as a rocket battery, to the front, and sent a volley of rockets through the crowd on the ramparts.. After a second salvo from the rocket battery, many of the rebels fled and the mosque was finally taken by storm. When Forbes-Mitchell entered the enclosure he found only numerous dead defenders. According to a modern historian, "Peel's rockets had tipped the scale and the Shah Najaf fell to the British just as they had been about to fall back".

Surviving rockets

As a weapon, Congreve rockets remained in regular use until the 1850s, when they were superseded by the improved spinning design of William Hale.  In the 1870s, Congreve rockets were used to carry rescue lines to vessels in distress, gradually superseding the mortar of Captain Manby that had been in operation from 1808 and rockets designed by John Dennett (1780-1852) that had been deployed in the late 1820s. These were first used to carry out a rescue in 1832 and used in the Irex rescue as late as 1890.

The Science Museum has two eighteenth-century Indian war rockets in its collection. The Musée national de la Marine in Paris also features one rocket. The Stonington Historical Society in Stonington, Connecticut has one rocket in their collection that was fired at the town by the British in August 1814 during the Battle of Stonington.
Other examples in the United States can be seen at The Smithsonian National Museum and the Fort McHenry Museum. The Wittenburg Museum in Germany has a later-era rocket, and there is a reproduction of it in the Leipzig Museum; there is also one in a private collection in Leipzig.

Published descriptions

 In the 1790s the Fathul Mujahidin was published. It is a military manual that was written by Tipu Sultan, a ruler of the Kingdom of Mysore, who was considered to be the father of rocket artillery in battle for his use of iron-cased rocket artillery against the British Army in 1792, which is considered a technological evolution in military history. The siege of Seringapatam was the final battle of the Third Anglo-Mysore War.
 In 1804, Congreve published: A concise account of the origin and progress of the rocket system.
 A Concise Account of the Origin and Progress of the Rocket System, by William Congreve, son of the arsenal's commandant, was published in 1807.
 In 1814, Congreve published: The details of the rocket system.
 Congreve, William, Sir. (1827) A Treatise on the General Principles, Powers, and Facility of Application of the Congreve Rocket System. (London: Longman, Rees, Orme, Brown, and Green).
 The First Golden Age of Rocketry: Congreve and Hale Rockets of the Nineteenth Century, Frank H. Winter, Smithsonian Institution Press, 1990. .
 CE Franklin British Rockets of the Napoleonic and Colonial Wars 1805-1901. Spellmount Ltd. 
 Werrett, Simon. ‘William Congreve's Rational Rockets.’ Notes & Records of the Royal Society 63 (2009): 35-56

In popular culture

 The "Rocket's red glare" in the "Star-Spangled Banner" is a reference to the Congreve rocket. 
 In Age of Empires III, the British civilization has rockets as a unique unit based on the Congreve rocket.
 In Mount and Blade: Napoleonic Wars, British rocket artillery are a playable class.
 In Empire: Total War, Congreve rockets are a usable artillery unit.
 In Bernard Cornwell's novel Sharpe's Enemy, and its television adaptation, Congreve rockets appear and are instrumental in the victory at the end.  Cornwell also describes the (historical) firing of a rocket during the Waterloo campaign in his later novel Sharpe's Waterloo.
 In George Macdonald Fraser's novel Flashman at the Charge, Harry Flashman uses Congreve rockets captured from the Russians to help repel a Russian assault in Central Asia.
 In Timothy Mo's novel about the foundation of Hong Kong, An Insular Possession, Congreve rockets are used by Captain Elliot from the steamer Nemesis against Chinese forts on the Pearl River.
 Death to the French, a novel by C. S. Forester. On pages 111 to 113, a graphic fictional description of the action on 13 November 1810 when they tried unsuccessfully to fire the French dockyard at Santarem with rockets.
 In the TV series The Terror, Congreve rockets are carried by Franklin's lost expedition and used in a skirmish.
 In Tessa Dare's Regency Romance, The Duchess Deal (2017), the hero protagonist, the Duke of Ashbury, has survived severe injury by a malfunctioning Congreve rocket at Waterloo (chapter 17).

References

Citations

Bibliography

 Franklin, Carl E. (2005). British Rockets of the Napoleonic and Colonial Wars 1805-1901. Stroud, Gloucestershire: Spellmount. 
 Graves, Donald E. (1989). Sir William Congreve and the Rockets' Red Glare - Historical Arms Series, No. 23. Bloomfield, Ontario. Museum Restoration service. 
 Heidler, David Stephen & Jeanne T. (2004). Encyclopedia of the War Of 1812. Annapolis, Maryland: Naval Institute Press. 
 Malcolmson, Robert. (2009). The A to Z of the War of 1812. Lanham, Maryland: Scarecrow Press. 
 Nicolas, Paul Harris (1845). Historical Record of the Royal Marine Forces, Volume 2 [1805–1842]. London: Thomas & William Boone.

External links

 

English inventions
Rocket artillery
Early rocketry